Chandrakanthgowda Channappagowda Patil is an Indian politician who is currently serving as the Minister of Public Works Department of Karnataka from 04 August 2021. He is a member of the Karnataka Legislative Assembly  from Nargund, Karnataka. He is a member of the Bharatiya Janata Party, who had served as Minister for Women and Child Welfare department, Government of Karnataka in the D. V. Sadananada Gowda Ministry. He was a member of the legislative assembly from Nargund from 2004 to 2013 and again was re-elected during 2018 assembly elections. He is currently serving as Minister for Mines and Geology from Commerce & Industries department and Ecology & Environment department in the B. S. Yediyurappa cabinet.

He resigned as a Minister on 8 February 2012 during the Karnataka video clip controversy.

References

People from Gadag district
Bharatiya Janata Party politicians from Karnataka
Living people
Karnataka politicians
State cabinet ministers of Karnataka
Karnataka MLAs 2008–2013
Karnataka MLAs 2018–2023
1958 births
Karnataka MLAs 2004–2007